Prince Abdulaziz bin Mohammed bin Ayyaf Al Muqrin or Al-Migrin (born 1958) is a Saudi Arabian architect, philanthropist, politician and a member of the Muqrin clan, from which the ruling family is branched who was the fifth mayor of Riyadh from 1997 till 24 June 2012. He currently serves as the chairman of the board of trustees at Prince Sultan University and King Salman Center for Local Governance and as the vice chairman of the board of directors of the Riyadh Science Foundation.

Honours and awards 

 Order of King Abdulaziz (2002)

References

External links
Municipality

1958 births
Living people
Saudi Arabian Muslims
Saudi Arabian princes
Mayors of places in Saudi Arabia
People from Riyadh